Gustavo Bacarisa (1872–1971) GMH was a Gibraltarian painter. He was born in Gibraltar and died in Seville, Spain. His work, of a figurative style and varied themes, is characterised by the rich use of colour. He was married to Swedish artist and designer Elsa Jernås.

Career

Bacarisas studied in Paris, France and worked in Buenos Aires, Argentina until 1916. He later relocated to the Andalusian capital of Seville. He also travelled to Sweden in order to create the sets and figurines for the opera Carmen. He did the same for the premier of El amor brujo at the Teatro Español in Madrid. During the Spanish civil war he relocated, this time to the Portuguese island of Madeira, returning in 1937 to Gibraltar. At the end of the Second World War, he moved to Spain, settling down in Seville.

Bacarisas exhibited his work in many Spanish cities as well as abroad. He was granted a gold medal and the title of honorary professor by the Real Academia de Bellas Artes de Santa Isabel de Hungría and was made member of the Real Academia de Bellas Artes de San Fernando.

See also
List of Gibraltarians

References

External links 

Biography of Gustavo Bacarisas y Podestá (in Spanish), taken from 

1873 births
1971 deaths
Gibraltarian emigrants to Spain
20th-century Gibraltarian painters